The Sorcerer's Apprentice is a 2010 American action adventure 
fantasy film produced by Jerry Bruckheimer, directed by Jon Turteltaub, and released by Walt Disney Pictures, the team behind the National Treasure film series. The film stars Nicolas Cage and Jay Baruchel with Alfred Molina, Teresa Palmer, and Monica Bellucci in supporting roles.

The film is named after a segment in Disney's non-consecutive film pair the 1940 film Fantasia and the 1999 film Fantasia 2000 called The Sorcerer's Apprentice starring Mickey Mouse (with one scene being an extensive reference to it), which in turn is based on the late-1890s symphonic poem by Paul Dukas and the 1797 Johann Wolfgang von Goethe ballad. Balthazar Blake (Nicolas Cage), a "Merlinean", is a sorcerer in modern-day Manhattan, fighting against the forces of evil, in particular his nemesis, Maxim Horvath (Alfred Molina), while searching for the person who will eventually inherit Merlin's powers ("The Prime Merlinean"). This turns out to be Dave Stutler (Jay Baruchel), a physics student, whom Balthazar takes as a reluctant protégé. The sorcerer gives his unwilling apprentice a crash course in the art of science, magic, and sorcery, in order to stop Horvath and Morgana le Fay (Alice Krige) from raising the souls of the evil dead sorcerers ("Morganians") and destroying the world.

The Sorcerer's Apprentice made its premiere at the Fantasia Film Festival on July 8, 2010, and was theatrically released by Disney in the United States on July 14. The film received mixed reviews from critics and was a box office disappointment, grossing only $215 million against a $150 million budget.

Plot

In 740 AD, in England, the mighty magician Merlin has three apprentices; Balthazar Blake, Veronica Gorloisen and Maxim Horvath. Horvath betrays his master by joining forces with the evil sorceress Morgana le Fay. Morgana mortally wounds Merlin before Veronica is able to rip Morgana's soul from her body and absorbs it into her own. As Morgana attempts to kill Veronica by possessing her from within, Balthazar stops her by imprisoning Morgana and Veronica in the "Grimhold", a magic prison in the shape of a nesting doll. Before dying, Merlin gives Balthazar a dragon figurine that will identify the Prime Merlinean, Merlin's descendant and the only one able to defeat Morgana. While he searches for his descendant throughout history, Balthazar imprisons Morganians, sorcerers who try to release Morgana, including Horvath, into successive layers on the Grimhold.

In 2000, in New York City, the Prime Merlinean is revealed to be 10-year-old Dave Stutler, who encounters Balthazar in his Manhattan antique store, after straying from his school field trip. When Balthazar gives Dave Merlin's dragon figurine, the statue comes to life and wraps itself around the boy's finger to form a ring. When Balthazar goes to retrieve a book meant to teach magic, Dave accidentally opens the Grimhold, releasing the imprisoned Horvath. While battling for possession of the Grimhold, Balthazar and Horvath are imprisoned in an ancient Chinese urn with a ten-year lock curse. Dave is then ridiculed by his classmates when he claims he saw magic, only to find the shop empty. He is faced with severe bullying, and is misdiagnosed with hallucination caused by a "glucose imbalance", whilst nevertheless keeping the ring.

Ten years later, Dave, now 20 years old, is a physics student at New York University, and meets his childhood crush Becky. He immediately becomes smitten with her, and repairs the transmitting mast of the radio station she works at after it is struck by lightning. The ten-year imprisonment curse of the urn ends, releasing Horvath and Balthazar. Horvath pursues Dave and the Grimhold. Balthazar rescues Dave, riding an animated steel eagle adapted from a Chrysler Building gargoyle. Dave initially refuses to help Balthazar, having been under psychiatric care since their first meeting, until Balthazar agrees to leave after finding the Grimhold. They track the Grimhold to Chinatown, where Horvath has released the next Morganian, Sun Lok. Dave defeats Sun Lok, and Balthazar retrieves the Grimhold. Dave changes his mind, deciding that he likes magic after all, and agrees to become Balthazar's apprentice. He also becomes romantically involved with Becky against Balthazar's wishes and advice, impressing her by playing the OneRepublic song "Secrets" with the Tesla coils he has been experimenting with.

Horvath enlists a youthful Morganian, celebrity magician Drake Stone to get back the Grimhold. They attempt to kill Dave, but Balthazar saves him. Cued by Horvath, Dave demands to know the truth about Balthazar's quest. Balthazar reveals that Morgana is trapped in the Grimhold with Veronica. Morgana, if freed, would cast a spell called "The Rising", which would revive sorcerers from the dead and enslave mankind. As Prime Merlinian, Dave will become powerful enough to cast spells without his ring (a focus, which for any other magician is the only way to channel their magic), and is the only one who can stop her. Despite Balthazar's disdain of his relationship with Becky, Dave convinces him to allow him to meet her for a date. Dave tries to use magic to clean his lab, but loses control of his animated cleaning mops, which forces him to cancel his date with Becky. He is saved because of Balthazar's intervention and, disillusioned, decides to give up on magic, until Becky unknowingly changes his mind. He returns to his underground subway lab, just as Drake and Horvath try to kill Balthazar and steal the Grimhold. Horvath, having no more use for Drake, casts a parasite spell and steals Drake's magic and his ring.

Horvath releases the witch Abigail Williams, uses her to kidnap Becky at the radio station, then steals her magic and pendant focus. He threatens to kill Becky, therefore forcing Dave to surrender the Grimhold and his ring. Balthazar goes after Horvath in Battery Park, sure that Dave, without his ring, will be killed. Horvath releases Morgana, who begins the Rising Spell while Horvath animates the Charging Bull sculpture and commands it to attack Balthazar. Dave arrives and stuns Horvath with a Tesla coil tied to Balthazar's car while Balthazar's eagle flies away with the bull. Becky disrupts the Rising Spell, stunning Morgana. Balthazar takes Morgana, body and soul, from Veronica into himself, but Morgana escapes and tries to incinerate them. Dave attempts to stop her without his ring and succeeds, proving that he is the Prime Merlinean. Morgana shoots plasma bolts at the three and overwhelming Balthazar and Veronica's shield spells, kills Balthazar when he bodily intercepts a bolt meant for Veronica. Dave makes another, larger Tesla coil out of the square's lamp posts and power lines to overwhelm her and then fires a plasma barrage, which finally destroys her. He revives Balthazar by restarting his heart with plasma shocks, and Balthazar reunites with Veronica. Dave and Becky kiss, and fly to France for breakfast on Balthazar's eagle.

In a post-credits scene, Horvath retrieves his hat from Balthazar's shop.

Cast

 Nicolas Cage as Balthazar Blake; based on Yen Sid in Fantasia
 Jay Baruchel as David "Dave" Stutler, a nerdy but highly intelligent college student who becomes Blake's reluctant apprentice
 Jake Cherry as young Dave Stutler
 Alfred Molina as Maxim Horvath, an evil sorcerer and Balthazar's nemesis. Once friends with his fellow apprentices, he became embittered when Veronica chose Balthazar over himself, eventually turning against them and Merlin.
 Teresa Palmer as Rebecca "Becky" Barnes, Dave's love interest
 Peyton List as young Becky Barnes
 Toby Kebbell as Drake Stone, a Morganian who supports himself as a celebrity illusionist and joins forces with Horvath when called
 Omar Benson Miller as Bennet Zurrow, Dave's roommate
 Monica Bellucci as Veronica Gorloisen, a sorceress and Balthazar's love interest
 Alice Krige as Morgana le Fay
 Robert Capron as Oliver, Dave's childhood friend
 Ian McShane as the Narrator (uncredited)
 James A. Stephens as Merlin
 Gregory Woo as Sun Lok
 Nicole Ehinger as Abigail Williams
 Ethan Peck as Andre
 Adriane Lenox as Ms. Jessalyn Algar
 Henry Yuk as Chinese Dragon Carrier

Production
The basic idea for the film was mostly Nicolas Cage's, who wanted to explore a mystic world and play a character with magical powers, and following a suggestion by his producer friend Todd Garner, decided to make a feature-length movie based upon the Fantasia segment of the same name. On February 12, 2007, this film was announced by Disney. References to the original animation include the scene where Dave animates mops to clean his laboratory, and having Mickey Mouse's hat in the post-credits scene.

Filming

The Sorcerer's Apprentice is set in New York City, and most scenes were shot on location, in places such as Washington Square Park and Chinatown's Eldrige Street. Dave's laboratory was filmed in either an abandoned subway station located under the New York City Hall or a studio recreation of it. The Bedford Armory in Crown Heights held several of the movie's sets, including Dave's laboratory, complete with inactive Tesla coil generators, Drake Stone's penthouse apartment and even part of Chinatown.

In the early morning hours of May 4, 2009, a Ferrari F430 being driven during filming of a chase sequence, lost control and careened into the window of a Sbarro restaurant in Times Square, injuring two pedestrians, one of whom was struck by a falling lamppost. Filming resumed the following night, when yet another accident occurred. The two accidents were blamed on rain making the roads slick.

To make the magic more believable, it was decided to have an emphasis on practical, on-set effects, such as making real fire, with fluids or flash powder being used for colored flames. To provide a lighting reference for the plasma bolts, the actors wore gloves with LED displays to make them glow before adding the computer-generated shot. For floating objects, they were either thrown with wires or held by stuntmen wearing green chroma key suits.

Reception

Critical response
On Rotten Tomatoes, the film has an approval rating of 40% based on 174 reviews with an average rating of 5.30/10. The site's critical consensus reads, "It has a likable cast and loads of CGI spectacle, but for all but the least demanding viewers, The Sorcerer's Apprentice will be less than spellbinding." On Metacritic, the film has a score of 46 out of 100 based on 34 critics, indicating "mixed or average reviews". Audiences polled by CinemaScore gave the film an average grade of "B+" on an A+ to F scale.

Kirk Honeycutt of The Hollywood Reporter has said that "The Sorcerer's Apprentice is a tired relic of summer-movie cliches, clearly beaten to death by far too many credited writers." Chicago Sun-Times film critic Roger Ebert gave the film two and a half stars out of four and wrote "This is a much better film than The Last Airbender, which is faint praise, but it's becoming clear that every weekend brings another heavily marketed action 'comedy' that pounds tens of millions out of consumers before evaporating".

Box office
The Sorcerer's Apprentice made an opening gross of $3,873,997 on its first day (Wednesday July 14, 2010). It finished at #3 on its first weekend with $17,619,622 behind Inception and Despicable Me in the U.S. and Canada and gained another $8,928,216 on its first weekend internationally (in 13 countries) for a worldwide opening of $26,547,841. On October 28, 2010, The Sorcerer's Apprentice closed at the box-office in the United States and Canada with $63,150,991. As of December 12, 2010, it has earned $152,132,612 in other countries totaling $215,283,603 worldwide. Besides the U.S. and Canada, other countries where it grossed more than $10 million were Russia and the CIS ($13,630,194), France and the Maghreb region ($12,930,320) and Japan ($10,632,660). Its largest international weekend was August 13–15, during which it grossed $14,091,169 in 42 countries. It occupies the fourth place on the all-time chart of Sword and Sorcery films in the U.S. and Canada, and the third place on the same chart worldwide. In July 2010, Parade magazine listed the film #1 on its list of "Worst Box Office Disasters of 2010 (So Far)".

Home media
The Sorcerer's Apprentice was released on Blu-ray and DVD on November 30, 2010. It has sold 1,288,735 DVD units (equivalent to $21,609,680) since its release in DVD. Adding in its box-office revenue, the film's earnings sum up to $236,893,283.

Accolades 
The Sorcerer's Apprentice was nominated for Choice Summer Movie at the 2010 Teen Choice Awards. It placed one of the Top Box Office Films at the 2011 ASCAP Awards.

Music

The film's score was composed by Trevor Rabin. It was released on July 6, 2010.

The songs "Secrets" by OneRepublic and "The Middle" by Jimmy Eat World are used in the film but do not appear on the album.

References

External links

 
 

2010 films
2010s buddy films
2010s fantasy adventure films
American fantasy adventure films
Walt Disney Pictures films
Films set in the 8th century
Films set in 2000
Films set in 2010
Films set in England
Films set in New York City
Films shot in New York City
Films shot in New Jersey
Films directed by Jon Turteltaub
Films produced by Jerry Bruckheimer
Films scored by Trevor Rabin
Films about magic and magicians
Films about witchcraft
Films about wizards
Arthurian films
Disney film remakes
Saturn Films films
Films based on works by Johann Wolfgang von Goethe
American buddy action films
American films about revenge
Films about physics
American children's adventure films
American children's fantasy films
Fantasia (franchise)
Works based on The Sorcerer's Apprentice
2010s English-language films
2010s American films